Tarchonanthea is a genus of tephritid  or fruit flies in the family Tephritidae.

Species
Tarchonanthea frauenfeldi (Schiner, 1868)
Tarchonanthea coleoptrata Freidberg & Kaplan, 1993

References

Tephritinae
Tephritidae genera
Diptera of Africa